James Hay Erskine Wemyss (29 August 1829 – 29 March 1864) was a Scottish Member of Parliament, representing Fife from 1859 until his death.

Family

He was the son of James Erskine Wemyss by his wife Emma, daughter of William Hay, 17th Earl of Erroll.

On 17 April 1855, at All Saints' Church, Knightsbridge, he married Millicent Anne Mary, daughter of the Hon. John Kennedy-Erskine and his wife Lady Augusta FitzClarence. She was the granddaughter of Archibald Kennedy, 1st Marquess of Ailsa and of King William IV of the United Kingdom. 
Their children included 
Mary Frances Erskine Wemyss (1856–1936) married Cecil Stratford Paget 28 February 1882
Dora Mina (1856–1894), who married Lord Henry Grosvenor and was the mother of William Grosvenor, 3rd Duke of Westminster
Randolph Gordon (1858–1908), who inherited the Wemyss estates and is the ancestor of the present Chief of Clan Wemyss
Hugo Erskine Wemyss (1861–1933), comptroller of the Grand Duchess of Mecklenburg's household in Britain
Rosslyn Wemyss, 1st Baron Wester Wemyss (1864–1933), who served as First Sea Lord during the First World War.

Career

He was elected M.P. for Fife at the general election in 1859.

On 5 February 1864, he was appointed Lord Lieutenant of Fife and Sheriff Principal of the shire of Fife, in the room of the Earl of Elgin, deceased.

Notes

References
 https://web.archive.org/web/20111003160503/http://www.leighrayment.com/commons/Fcommons.htm

External links 
 

1829 births
1864 deaths
Members of the Parliament of the United Kingdom for Scottish constituencies
UK MPs 1859–1865
Lord-Lieutenants of Fife
Scottish Liberal Party MPs